Francis Alexander Keith-Falconer, 8th Earl of Kintore, 10th Lord Falconer of Halkerton, 8th Lord Keith of Inverurie and Keith Hall, Chief of Clan Keith (7 June 1828 – 18 July 1880), was a Scottish aristocrat.

Early life
Keith-Falconer was born on 7 June 1828. He was the second son of Anthony Keith-Falconer, 7th Earl of Kintore and, his second wife, Louisa (née Hawkins), Countess of Kintore. After his parents divorced in 1840, his mother remarried to Dr. B. North Arnold (but died a year later in 1841).  His elder brother was Lt. Hon. William Adrian Keith-Falconer, styled Lord Inverurie. His younger brother was Maj. Hon. Charles James Keith-Falconer, Commissioner of the Inland Revenue and his only sister was Lady Isabella Catherine Keith-Falconer (the wife of Henry Grant of Congalton).

His paternal grandparents were William Keith-Falconer, 6th Earl of Kintore and the former Maria Bannerman (daughter of Sir Alexander Bannerman, 6th Baronet). His mother was the youngest daughter of Francis Hawkins of Bareilly, Bengal, India.

Career
His elder brother, Lord Inverurie, died unmarried in 1843 and Francis became heir apparent to his father, who died the following year on 11 July 1844 at which point he became the 8th Earl of Kintore, 8th Lord Keith of Inverurie and Keith Hall.

On 28 May 1856, he became Lord Lieutenant of Kincardineshire succeeding James Carnegie, 9th Earl of Southesk. He served in that role until 1863 when he was succeeded by Sir James Burnett, 10th Baronet. In December 1863, Lord Kintore became Lord Lieutenant of Aberdeenshire, succeeding Charles Gordon, 10th Marquess of Huntly. He served in that role until his death. After his death, he was succeeded by John Hamilton-Gordon, 1st Marquess of Aberdeen and Temair.

Personal life

On 24 June 1851, Lord Kintore was married to his cousin Louisa Madeleine Hawkins (d. 1916), the second daughter of his maternal uncle, Francis Hawkins. Together, they were the parents of: 
 Algernon Hawkins Thomond Keith-Falconer, 9th Earl of Kintore, who married Lady Sydney Charlotte Montagu, the second daughter of George Montagu, 6th Duke of Manchester.
 Hon. Dudley Metcalfe Courtenay Keith-Falconer (1854–1873), who died unmarried.
 Hon. Ion Grant Neville Keith-Falconer (1856–1887), who married Gwendolen Bevan, a daughter of British banker Robert Cooper Lee Bevan of Fosbury House, in 1884; after his death she married Lt.-Col. Frederick Bradshaw in 1894.
 Lady Madeleine Dora Keith-Falconer (1858–1925), who married Capt. Francis Henry Tonge, a son of Capt. Louis Tonge of the Royal Navy, in 1889.
 Lady Blanche Catherine Keith-Falconer (1859–1922), who married Col. Granville Roland Francis Smith of Duffield Hall, a son of MP Rowland Smith, in 1883.
 Hon Arthur Keith-Falconer (1863–1877), who died young.
 Lady Maude Keith-Falconer (b. 1869)

Lord Kintore died on 18 July 1880. His widow, the dowager Countess of Kintore, died on 6 February 1916.

References

1828 births
1880 deaths
Nobility from Edinburgh
Earls of Kintore